Ludovico I or Louis I (Italian: Lodovico; 24 February 1413 – 29 January 1465) was Duke of Savoy from 1440 until his death in 1465.

Life
He was born at Geneva the son of Amadeus VIII, Duke of Savoy and Mary of Burgundy; he was the first to hold the title of Prince of Piedmont. On 1 November 1433 (or 12 February 1434), at Chambéry, he married Princess Anne of Cyprus, an heiress of the Kingdom of Cyprus and the defunct Kingdom of Jerusalem. The family lived in Allaman Castle, Vaud/Switzerland and as Count de Vaud, Savoy tried to conquer the Duchy of Milan, then under the Repubblica Ambrosiana, but failed.

In 1452 he received the Shroud of Turin from Margaret de Charny. It was held by the House of Savoy until 1946, at the end of the Kingdom of Italy and bequeathed to the Holy See in 1983.

Louis died at Lyon in 1465, while returning from France.

Issue
Louis and Anne had:
 Amadeus IX (Thonon, 1 February 1435 – 30 March 1472), Duke of Savoy, married Yolande of France
 Louis (Thonon, 5 June 1436 – Ripaille, 12 July 1482), Count of Geneva, King of Cyprus.
 Marie (Morges, March 1437 – Thonon, 1 December 1437)
 Jean (1437?–1440)
 Philip II (Thonon, 5 February 1438 – Torino, 7 November 1497), Duke of Savoy, married Margaret of Bourbon
 Marguerite (Pinerolo, April 1439 – Bruges, 9 March 1485), married firstly in December 1458 Giovanni IV Paleologo, Marquis of Montferrat and secondly Pierre II de Luxembourg, Count of St. Pol, of Brienne, de Ligny, Marle, and Soissons
 Pierre (Genève, c. 2 February 1440 – Torino, 21 October 1458), Archbishop of Tarentasia.
 Janus (Genève, 8 November 1440 – Annecy, 22 December 1491), Count of Faucigny and Geneva, married Helene of Luxembourg, daughter of Louis de Luxembourg, Count of Saint-Pol, and his first wife Jeanne de Bar, Countess of Marle and Soissons
 Charlotte (Chambéry, 16 November 1441 – Amboise, 1 December 1483), married King Louis XI of France
 Aimon (Genève, 2 November 1442 – Genève, 30 March 1443)
 Jacques (Genève, 29 November 1444 – Genève 1 June 1445)
 Agnes (Chambéry, October 1445 – Paris, 16 March 1509), married François d'Orléans, Duke of Longueville. Their son was Louis I d'Orléans, duc de Longueville
 Jean Louis (Genève, 26 February 1447 – Torino, 4 July 1482), Bishop of Genève
 Maria (Pinerolo, 20 March 1448 – 13 September 1475), married Louis of Luxembourg, Count of St. Pol, of Brienne, de Ligny, and Conversano, Constable of France
 Bona (Avigliana, 12 August 1449 – Fossano, 17 November 1503), married Galeazzo Maria Sforza, Duke of Milan
 Giacomo (Genève, 12 November 1450 – Ham in Picardy, 30 January 1486), Count of Romont, Lord of Vaud
 Anne (Genève, September 1452 – Genève, 1 October 1452)
 François (Annecy, 19 August 1454 – Torino 6 October 1490), Archbishop of Auch and Bishop of Geneva
 Jeanne (died without alliance, 1455?)

References

Sources

1413 births
1465 deaths
15th-century Dukes of Savoy
People from Geneva
Counts of Geneva
Princes of Savoy